Bujoreni may refer to several places in Romania:

 Bujoreni, Teleorman
 Bujoreni, Vâlcea
 Bujoreni, a village in Buzoești Commune, Argeș County